Allentown is a city in Bleckley, Laurens, Twiggs, and Wilkinson counties in the U.S. state of Georgia, primarily in Wilkinson County. As of the 2010 census, the city had a population of 169, down from 287 at the 2000 census. The Twiggs County portion is part of the Macon Metropolitan Statistical Area, while the Laurens County portion is part of the Dublin Micropolitan Statistical Area. The remaining Wilkinson and Bleckley County portions are not part of any metropolitan or micropolitan area.

History
Allentown was named in 1891 when the Macon, Dublin & Savannah Railroad was extended to that point. John Allen, an early postmaster, gave the town his last name. Allentown was incorporated in 1901.

Geography
The center of Allentown and most of the buildings are in the southern corner of Wilkinson County, but the city limits extend west into Twiggs County, south into Bleckley County, and southeast into Laurens County.

U.S. Route 80 passes through the center of town, leading northwest  to Jeffersonville and southeast  to Dublin. Interstate 16 passes through the south end of the city, with access from Exit 32 (State Route 112). I-16 leads northwest  to Macon and southeast  to Savannah. State Route 112 passes through the center of Allentown as Balls Ferry Road, leading northeast  to U.S. Route 441 at Nicklesville and southwest  to Cochran.

The north side of Allentown drains to Devils Branch, a tributary of Turkey Creek and part of the Oconee River watershed. The south side drains to Little Rocky Creek, a tributary of Rocky Creek, then Turkey Creek and the Oconee.

Demographics

As of the census of 2000, there were 287 people, 121 households, and 72 families residing in the town. The racial makeup of the town was 64.46% White, 35.19% African American, and 0.40% from two or more races. Hispanic or Latino of any race were 0.70% of the population.

There were 121 households, out of which 28.9% had children under the age of 18 living with them, 45.5% were married couples living together, 9.9% had a female householder with no husband present, and 39.7% were non-families. 35.5% of all households were made up of individuals, and 23.1% had someone living alone who was 65 years of age or older.  The average household size was 2.37 and the average family size was 3.16.

In the town, the population was spread out, with 27.2% under the age of 18, 4.5% from 18 to 24, 24.7% from 25 to 44, 27.5% from 45 to 64, and 16.0% who were 65 years of age or older.  The median age was 39 years. For every 100 females, there were 84.0 males.  For every 100 females age 18 and over, there were 75.6 males.

The median income for a household in the town was $31,500, and the median income for a family was $52,969. Males had a median income of $41,875 versus $26,250 for females. The per capita income for the town was $16,475.  About 16.4% of families and 19.5% of the population were below the poverty line, including 23.2% of those under the age of eighteen and 30.2% of those sixty five or over.

References

External links
Official website

Cities in Bleckley County, Georgia
Cities in Laurens County, Georgia
Cities in Twiggs County, Georgia
Cities in Wilkinson County, Georgia
Cities in Georgia (U.S. state)
Macon metropolitan area, Georgia
Dublin, Georgia micropolitan area